Michael John Towey (June 17, 1902 – September 29, 1960) was an organized labor leader and Democratic politician from Philadelphia.

Towey was born in 1902 in County Mayo, Ireland, the son of Joseph and Ann Towey. He emigrated to the United States at the age of 15 and graduated from Philadelphia's Northeast High School. He later attended the University of Pennsylvania before graduating with an engineering degree from Drexel Institute of Technology. After graduating, Towey worked as a plumber and became the business representative of the United Association of Plumbers. He was later elected the president of Plumbers Union Local 690. Towey also became involved in Democratic party politics, running for the Democratic nomination in the 5th state Senate district in 1936. He fared poorly, placing a distant second to the machine candidate, Israel Stiefel.

Towey's prospects with the party improved by 1947, when he and Anthony Massing were nominated without opposition for Philadelphia City Council in the 5th district (the district sent two members to Council at the time). They went down to defeat in November against Republican nominees Louis Schwartz and Frederic Garman. Towey solidified his position in the party three years later when he defeated the machine-backed incumbent to become ward leader of the 19th ward (located in West Kensington). In 1951, he ran again for City Council from the river wards' newly drawn 6th district and was elected with 55% of the vote. Towey's election was part of a Democratic wave that combined with independent, pro-reform Republicans to sweep the Republican machine from power for the first time in 67 years.

The Democrats had come to power in the city because of their backing of a new city charter that reduced waste and mandated civil service reform. By 1954, however, Towey joined fellow Democrat James Hugh Joseph Tate in an effort to weaken the civil service reforms of the new charter. They fell just of the two-thirds vote in Council to put their amendments on the ballot. The following year, he was reelected with a slightly increased majority of 56%. In 1956, Towey and Tate again proposed charter amendments aimed at weakening civil service protections and this time found the required vote to put it on to the ballot for popular approval. The referendum failed in a vote that April.

In 1959, Towey ran for a third Council term and defeated Republican Stanley Bednarek with 60.3% of the vote, his greatest margin to date. The next year, he suffered a heart attack at his Juniata Park home and died at the age of 58. He was survived by his wife, the former Pearl Weidmayer, and was buried in Philadelphia's North Cedar Hill Cemetery.

References

Sources

1902 births
1960 deaths
Philadelphia City Council members
Pennsylvania Democrats
University of Pennsylvania alumni
American plumbers
20th-century American politicians
Irish emigrants to the United States (before 1923)